The 2012–13 season was Portsmouth's first season in League One. This was the first time that Portsmouth had played in the third tier of English football since the 1982–83 season. Portsmouth were relegated to League Two on 16 April 2013, following Oldham Athletic's win over Yeovil Town.

Players

Squad details

1 Not in first team squad, but appeared at least on the bench in a first team game.

Transfers

In

  
  
  

   

 
 

  
  
  
  
  
  
  
  
 
  
 
  
  

  
  
  
  
  
  
  
  
  

Total spending:  £0

Trialists

Out

  

  
  
  

  
  
  
  
  
  
  
  
  
  
  
  
  
  
  
  
 

  

Total gaining:  £2,250,000

Notes
1Although officially undisclosed, the Portsmouth News reported the fee to be £600,000.

2Although officially a free transfer, the Yorkshire Evening Post reported the fee to be £250,000.

3Although officially undisclosed, the Portsmouth News reported the fee to be £200,000.

Key events
28 April: After the last game of the season, Portsmouth manager Michael Appleton says that "17 or 18 players could be leaving the club and the same number coming in" in this summer.
4 May: Jason Pearce is sold to Leeds United for a £500,000 fee.
18 May: Balram Chainrai's Portpin propose terms for a CVA that would enable Pompey to come out of administration.
21 May: West Ham United buy Stephen Henderson after a successful loan spell in the club, for a rumoured £600,000 fee.
28 May: Portsmouth sell Joel Ward to Crystal Palace for a £400,000 fee.
9 June: Kelvin Etuhu leaves Portsmouth to join Barnsley.
3 July: Professional Footballers' Association chief executive Gordon Taylor says Portsmouth's players must reach a compromise on wages to save the club.
9 July: Portsmouth announces four players on trial: Jon Harley, Mustapha Dumbuya, Simon Eastwood and Laurie Walker.
12 July: Birmingham City bring in Hayden Mullins.
12 July: Aaron Mokoena agrees his departure from Pompey.
12 July: Portsmouth have been told by the Football League they will start the new season on -10 points if they are to be allowed into League One.
12 July: The Pompey Supporters Trust says its bid to buy Portsmouth is 'ongoing' and has welcomed news land surrounding Fratton Park could be up for sale.
13 July: Balram Chainrai's Portpin withdraw his bid.
14 July: Márkó Futács refused Portsmouth's new contract and signed with Leicester City, with Pompey receiving compensation.
16 July: Portsmouth announces five more trialists: Luke Rodgers, Brian Howard, Simon Gillett, Lloyd Sam and Izale McLeod.
18 July: Portsmouth announces three more trialists: David Preece, Julien Lopez and Sotiris Balafas.
24 July: Gibraltarian midfielder Liam Walker joins Portsmouth on trial.
24 July: Leeds United signs Luke Varney for a £300,000 fee.
24 July: Administrator Trevor Birch confirmed that Portsmouth will close on 10 August unless highest earners agree transfer cuts.
25 July: Pompey Supporters Trust has stated it is ready to buy the club, but it can only do so if the high earners leave the club.
26 July: Leeds United signs David Norris.
27 July: Nottingham Forest signs Greg Halford.
28 July: Flamboyant winger Erik Huseklepp agreed a move back to his homeland, signing a four-and-a-half deal with SK Brann.
30 July: Portsmouth legend Nwankwo Kanu agrees a contract termination with the club.
3 August: Dave Kitson agrees a contract termination with the club.
9 August: Tal Ben Haim is released by Portsmouth, after cancelling the remaining year of his contract.
10 August: Liam Lawrence leaves the club.
11 August: Two more trialists join Portsmouth: Jerel Ifil and Jordan Santiago.
11 September: Former Portsmouth owner Sulaiman Al-Fahim starts negotiations to become the third bidder to try and purchase the club.
18 September: Former Watford owner Lawrance Bassani submits a bid to try and buy the club, becoming the fourth bidder in the ownership saga.
19 September: A Fifth bidder has emerged, named as the firm Portco Ltd, fronted by Harry Kerr. But there is still no more news concerning the other 4 bidders yet.
18 October: Portsmouth's administrator Trevor Birch announced that he nominated Portsmouth Supporters' Trust as the preferred bidder for the club.
7 November: Michael Appleton leaves club to manage Blackpool, along with first team coach Ashley Westwood. Guy Whittingham is appointed as caretaker manager.
9 November: Balram Chainrai suspends his Portsmouth bid.
15 November: Portsmouth Supporters' Trust reaches an agreement with PFK to buy the club.
21 November: PFK and Balram Chainrai will decide the value of Fratton Park in High Court on 13–14 December.
12 December: Portsmouth's administrators ask to adjourn the Court case.
14 December: Court case is adjourned until 15 January.
5 January: Portsmouth announces that will leave Eastleigh training ground at the end of the month.
14 January: Court case is adjourned again, until 31 January.
17 January: Luke Dowling (head of recruitment) and John Keeley (goalkeeper coach) join Blackburn Rovers.
21 January: Chris Neville (Strength and conditioning coach) signs for Blackburn Rovers.
25 January: Alan Knight is announced as new goalkeeping coach until the end of the season.
30 January: Court Case is adjourned to 14 February.
9 February: Portsmouth equalled its worst run in the club's history with nine defeats in a row and 19 games without a win.
12 February: Portsmouth set a new record in the club's history, after being twenty games without a win.
20 February: Court Case is set to go ahead after four adjournments.
21 February: Court Case is set a 19 April deadline.
27 February: Portsmouth Council finalises PST loan deal.
28 February: Stuart Robinson, who is working with Portsmouth Supporters' Trust, seals Fratton Park land deal.
2 March: Portsmouth end a run of 23-games without a win after a 2–1 victory against Crewe.
5 March: A date is set for the High Court hearing: 10 or 11 April.
8 March: Pompey Supporters Trust exchanges contract with administrators to buy Portsmouth.
5 April: Portsmouth completes 115 years of existence.
9 April: Court Case is confirmed to 10 April, and will begin at 10.30am.
10 April: A deal is agreed for PST to buy Portsmouth.
10 April: PST's chairman, Ashley Brown, released a statement saying that they "have a lot of people to thank", and that "now the next chapter of hard work begins to transform our club into something the community of Portsmouth can be proud of – both on and off the field."
16 April: Portsmouth is relegated to League Two after Oldham 1–0 victory over Yeovil.
19 April: Portsmouth Supporters' Trust finalises Portsmouth FC purchase.
20 April: Portsmouth suffers a 10-point deduction due to being out of administration.
20 April: Portsmouth Academy is declared 2012–13 Football League Youth Alliance champions.
24 April: Portsmouth appoint caretaker manager Guy Whittingham as full-time manager on a 1-year rolling contract.

Player statistics

Squad stats 

 

|-
|colspan="14"|Players on loan to other clubs:

|-
|colspan="14"|Players who have left the club after the start of the season:

 

|}

Top scorers

Assists
According to BBC Sport match reports.

Disciplinary record

Competition

League One

Results summary

Results by round

Pre-season

Competitive

League Cup

League One

Football League Trophy

FA Cup

Development Squad/Friendlies

Due to lack of first team players, Development squad matches were not needed for the rest of the season, as Development players were sent out on loan to non-league clubs. In addition to this, development squad supervisor Guy Whittingham became Portsmouth's caretaker manager.

References 

Portsmouth F.C. seasons
Portsmouth